The following is a list of notable amusement parks in Asia.

Armenia

Yerevan
 Victory Park

Bahrain

Manama
 Adhari Park

Bangladesh

Dhaka
 Fantasy Kingdom
 Shishu Park

Chittagong
 Foy's Lake Concord

Brunei
 Jerudong Park, Bandar Seri Begawan, Brunei-Muara

China, People's Republic of

Anhui
 Fantawild Adventure, Wuhu

Beijing
 Beijing Shijingshan Amusement Park
 Happy Valley
 Universal Studios Beijing
 World Chocolate Wonderland

Chongqing
 Fantawild Adventure, Chongqing

Guangdong
 Guangzhou Chimelong Tourist Resort:
 Chimelong Paradise, Guangzhou
 Fantawild Adventure, Shantou
 Overseas Chinese Town:
 China Folk Culture Village, Shenzhen
 Window of the World, Shenzhen
 Happy Valley, Shenzhen
 Splendid China, Shenzhen
 OCT East, Shenzhen
 Minsk World, Shenzhen (closed)
 Chimelong International Ocean Tourist Resort:
 Chimelong Ocean Kingdom, Zhuhai
 Lionsgate Entertainment World, Zhuhai

Heilongjiang
 Volga Manor, Harbin

Jiangsu
 Happy Valley Nanjing
 China Dinosaurs Park, Changzhou
 World Joyland, Wujin

Liaodong
 Dalian Discovery Kingdom, Dalian

Sichuan 
 Happy Valley Chengdu, Chengdu

Shanghai
 Jinjiang Action Park (Jinjiang Leyuan)
 Shanghai Disney Resort
 Shanghai Disneyland Park
 Shanghai Haichang Ocean Park
 Legoland Shanghai
 Shanghai Bund

Zhejiang
 Romon U-Park, Ningbo
 Six Flags Zhejiang, Haiyan County

Hong Kong
 Hong Kong Disneyland, Lantau Island
 Hong Kong Wetland Park, Yuen Long, New Territories
 Ma Wan Park, Lantau Island
 Ocean Park Hong Kong, Hong Kong Island
 Snoopy's World, Shatin, New Territories

India

Delhi
 Appu Ghar (closed)
Metro Walk

Gujarat
 Amaazia, Surat

Haryana

Gurgaon
 Appu Ghar
 Kingdom of Dreams

Kerala
 Wonderla, Kochi
 Mango Meadows, Kottayam
Vismaya, Kannur
 Malampuzha Dam, Palakkad

Maharashtra
 Adlabs Imagica, Khopoli
Snow Kingdom, Mumbai

Tamil Nadu

Chennai
 Dash n Splash (closed)
 Kishkinta
 MGM Dizzee World
Queen's Land
Snow Kingdom
 VGP Universal Kingdom

Coimbatore
Kovai Kondattam
Black Thunder
Maharaja Theme Park

Madurai
 Athisayam

Telangana

Hyderabad
 Jalavihar
 Ramoji Film City
 Snow World
 Wonderla

Nalgonda district
 Buddhavanam

Tripura 
 Agartala Amusement Park, Agartala (closed)

Uttar Pradesh
Worlds of Wonder Amusement Park, Noida

West Bengal

Kolkata
Aquatica
Eco Park
 Nicco Park
 Science City

Indonesia

Bali
 Bali Safari and Marine Park, Gianyar

East Kalimantan
Trans Studios Samarinda, Dadi Mulya Village, Samarinda

East Java
 Taman Safari II, Pasuruan
 Jawa Timur Park, Batu
 Wisata Bahari Lamongan, Lamongan

Jakarta
 Ancol Dreamland
 Mall of Indonesia
 Taman Mini Indonesia Indah

West Java
 Taman Safari I, Bogor
 Trans Studio Bandung, Trans Studio Mall Bandung, Bandung
 Trans Studio Cibubur, Trans Studio Mall Cibubur, Cibubur

South Sulawesi
 Trans Studio Makassar, Trans Studio Mall Makassar, Makassar

Iran

Tehran
Eram Park

Isfahan
 Dream land

Japan

Aichi Prefecture
 Lagunasia, Gamagōri
 Legoland Japan, Nagoya

Chiba Prefecture

Urayasu
 Tokyo Disney Resort
 Tokyo Disneyland
 Tokyo DisneySea

Fukuoka Prefecture

Kitakyūshū
 Space World, Yahata Higashi

Hokkaidō
 Rusutsu Resort, Rusutsu, Abuta

Asahikawa
 Asahiyama Zoo

Hyogo Prefecture

Himeji
 Himeji Central Park

Kanagawa Prefecture
 Yokohama Cosmo World, Yokohama

Kyoto Prefecture
 Shigureden, Kyoto

Mie Prefecture
 Nagashima Spa Land, Kuwana

Nagasaki Prefecture
 Huis Ten Bosch, Sasebo, Nagasaki

Osaka Prefecture

Osaka
 Festivalgate
 Universal Studios Japan

Saitama Prefecture
 Seibuen Amusement park, Tokorozawa
 Tobu Zoo, Miyashiro

Shiga Prefecture
 Ōtsu

Tokyo
 Hanayashiki, Taitō
 Joypolis, Minato
 Namco Namja Town, Toshima
 Sanrio Puroland, Tama
 Tama Tech, Hino
 Tokyo Dome City
 Yomiuriland, Inagi
 Kidzania Tokyo
 Tokyo Dome City Attractions, Bunkyo
 Yokohama Cosmo World, Yokohama

Yamanashi Prefecture
 Fuji-Q Highland, Fujiyoshida, Yamanashi

North Korea

Pyongyang
 Kaeson Youth Park
 Mangyongdae Funfair
 Munsu Funfair
 Pyongyang Folklore Park
 Rungna People's Pleasure Ground
 Taesongsan Funfair

South Korea

Gangwon Province
 Legoland Korea

Gyeonggi-do
 Seoul Land
 Everland

Gyeongsangbuk-do
 Geumo Land, Gumi
 Gyeongju World, Gyeongju

Incheon
 Paramount Movie Park Korea

Seoul
 Lotte World

Saudi Arabia

Jeddah
Al-Shallal Theme Park

Riyadh
Al Hokair Land

Kuwait

Kuwait City
 Kuwait Entertainment City, Doha
 KidZania, The Avenues

Malaysia

Kuala Lumpur
 Berjaya Times Square Theme Park

Pahang
 Berjaya Hills Resort, Bukit Tinggi

Genting Highlands
 Genting SkyWorlds

Selangor
 Kidzania Kuala Lumpur, Mutiara Damansara
 Sunway Lagoon, Subang Jaya

Kedah
 Bandar Darulaman Water Theme Park, Jitra

Malacca
 A' Famosa Resort
 Malacca Wonderland
 Mini Malaysia and ASEAN Cultural Park

Perak
 Lost World of Tambun
 MAPS Perak

Johor
 Legoland Malaysia Resort

Terengganu
 Islamic Heritage Park

Myanmar

Yangon
 Yangon Zoological Garden

Pakistan

Go Aish, Karachi
Jinnah Park, Rawalpindi
Joyland, Lahore
 Jungle World, Rawalpindi
Lake View Park, Islamabad
Shakarparian, Islamabad
Sindbad Amusement Parks

Philippines

Metro Manila

Marikina
 ChristmaSaya (September to February yearly)

Pasay
 DreamPlay
 SM By the Bay Amusement Park
 Star City

Taguig
 KidZania Manila ( Closed)

Quezon City
 Circle of Fun
 ABS-CBN Studios Experience
 Araneta Fiesta Park (during Christmas Season)

Luzon
 Camsur Watersports Park

Cavite 
 Sky Ranch, Tagaytay

Laguna Province
 Enchanted Kingdom, Santa Rosa City

Visayas

Cebu Province
 Anjo World Theme Park, Minglanilla

Negros Occidental Province
 Magikland, Silay City

Qatar

Doha
 KidZania, Aspire Park

Singapore

Haw Par Villa, Queenstown
Jurong Bird Park, Jurong
Marine Life Park, Resorts World Sentosa, Sentosa
Night Safari, Mandai
Singapore Zoo, Mandai
Snow City, Jurong
Underwater World, Sentosa
Universal Studios Singapore, Resorts World Sentosa, Sentosa

Sri Lanka

Western Province
 Diyatha Uyana
 Galle Face Green
 Viharamahadevi Park

Taiwan
 E-DA Theme Park, Dashu, Kaohsiung
 Farglory Ocean Park, Shoufeng, Hualien County
 Formosan Aboriginal Culture Village, Yuchi, Nantou County
 Janfusun Fancyworld, Gukeng, Yunlin County
 Leofoo Village Theme Park, Guanxi, Hsinchu County
 Lihpao Land, Houli District, Taichung
 Taroko Park, Cianjhen, Kaohsiung
 West Lake Resortopia, Sanyi, Miaoli County
 Window on China Theme Park, Longtan, Taoyuan City
 Yehliu Ocean World, Wanli, New Taipei

Thailand

Bangkok
 Dan Neramit (Magic Land), Phahon Yothin, Chatuchak - now defunct
 Happy Land, Bangkapi - now defunct
 KidZania Bangkok, Pathum Wan
 Safari World, Ramindra Km.9
 Siam Park City, Seri Thai

Chiang Mai Province
 Chiang Mai Night Safari, Ratchaphruck, Mae Hia
 Chiang Mai Zoo, Suthep

Pattaya City
 Mini Siam, Pattaya

Pathum Thani Province
 Dream World, Rangsit Khlong 3

Phuket Province
 Phuket FantaSea, Kamala Beach

Turkmenistan
 World of Turkmenbashi Tales, Ashgabat

United Arab Emirates

Abu Dhabi
 Ferrari World Abu Dhabi
 Warner Bros. World Abu Dhabi

Dubai
 IMG Worlds of Adventure
 Dubai Parks and Resorts
 Legoland Dubai

Dubai: planned or cancelled
Six Flags Dubai (late 2019)  Was scheduled to open in 2017.
Dubailand (2020)
Sahara Kingdom (suspended)  Within the Dubailand complex, construction was suspended by 2016.

Sharjah
 Adventureland

See also
List of amusement parks
List of water parks in Asia

References

Asia
Amusement parks
Amusement parks
Amusement parks